L64 may refer to:
The tactical numbering of the Zeppelin LZ 109
The L64/65 British assault rifle
The FAA identifier for Desert Center Airport